Roloff is both a surname and a given name. Notable people with the name include:

Surname
 Carola Roloff (b. 1959), German Buddhist nun
 Helmut Roloff (1912–2001), German pianist and teacher
 Julio Roloff (b. 1951), Cuban composer
 Lester Roloff (1914–1982), American fundamentalist Independent Baptist minister
 Matthew Roloff (b. 1961), American author, farmer, and businessman
 Roloff family in the reality series Little People, Big World, featuring Matthew, Amy, Jeremy, Zach, Molly, and Jacob

Given name
 Roloff Beny (1924–1984), Canadian photographer

See also 
 Rohloff, a manufacturer of bicycle components
 Rohloff (surname)